Napajedla is a town in the Zlín Region of the Czech Republic. It has about 7,100 inhabitants. The historic town centre is well preserved and is protected by law as an urban monument zone.

Etymology

The town's name is derived from the verb napojit, which means to water (horses). It refers to a ford, which was used by military caravans for stops and refreshments. Napajedla literally means watering holes.

Geography
It forms a conurbation with neighbouring Otrokovice. It lies on the Morava River. Most of the municipal territory lies in the Vizovice Highlands, but the area on the right bank of the Morava extends into the Chřiby range.

History
The first written mention of Napajedla is from 1355. In the 14th century, the settlement became a market town. For a long time, it was owned by the Zierotin family. The next important owner was the Rottal family. During their rule, the estate grew significantly and they had the Church of St. Bartholomew built.

The Napajedla estate achieved its greatest fame under the Lords of Stockau. The sulfur spa with a healing mineral water was established and Napajedla became a much-visited town. The existence of the mineral springs was first mentioned in documents from the 16th century. The springs were severely damaged when the railroad was built in the mid-19th century, and only one spring persisted. The spa was closed in the mid-20th century.

Napajedla was promoted to a town in 1898.

Demographics

Culture

Napajedla is located on the tripoint of the cultural and ethnographic regions of Moravian Wallachia, Moravian Slovakia and Hanakia. The town hosts an annual meeting of folk ensembles called Moravské chodníčky. Folklore ensembles Radovan and Radovánek with long history are based in the town.

Other annual cultural events are St. Wenceslaus Celebrations and Theatre Festival of Amateur Ensembles.

Sights

The pseudo-Renaissance town hall was built in 1898 to celebrate the promotion of Napajedla to a town. It was decorated by František Uprka and Jano Köhler.

The Napajedla Castle was built in the mid-18th century. It is surrounded by a  large English park. Today it serves as a hotel.

The Old Castle dates from the mid-17th century. It served as an aristocratic residence until the construction of the Napajedla Castle. Today it is also privately owned and used as a hotel.

An important monument is the stud farm, founded in 1886 by the then owner of the estate Aristide Baltazzi. The tradition of breeding thoroughbred here continues to this day. In a large area, in addition to English-style stables, there are also paddocks with horses and the so-called rotunda with the burial ground of the most famous stallions. 

The Church of Saint Bartholomew was built in 1710–1712. It replaced an older church with insufficient capacity.

There is a mineral spring called Slanica (from slaný, i.e. "salty") in the town. It is the only one of the original springs that persisted.

Notable people
Vincenc Prasek (1843–1912), historian, linguist; lived here
Božena Benešová (1873–1936), poet and writer; grew up here
Josef Šnejdárek (1875–1945), army general
Leoš Firkušný (1905–1950), musicologist
Rudolf Firkušný (1912–1994), pianist
Josef Bulva (1943–2020), pianist; studied here

Twin towns – sister cities

Napajedla is twinned with:
 Borský Mikuláš, Slovakia
 Kľak, Slovakia
 Ostrý Grúň, Slovakia

References

External links

Napajedla Information Centre

Cities and towns in the Czech Republic
Populated places in Zlín District